The Petersburg Sports Complex is a multi-purpose athletic venue located in Petersburg, Virginia, United States.  The facility includes four softball and one baseball field.  In addition to the field, the facility features a concession stand, restrooms, press boxes, offices, a public address system, and a scoreboard.  The baseball field was home to the Petersburg Generals of the Coastal Plain League, a collegiate summer baseball league.

The baseball field's dimensions are 320 ft. down the lines, 350 ft. to the gaps, and 375 ft. to dead center field.

References

College baseball venues in the United States
Baseball venues in Virginia
Buildings and structures in Petersburg, Virginia
Sports complexes in the United States